Yoshiyuki is both a masculine Japanese given name and a Japanese surname.

Possible writings
Yoshiyuki can be written using many different combinations of kanji characters. Here are some examples: 

義幸, "justice, happiness"
義之, "justice, of"
義行, "justice, to go"
吉幸, "good luck, happiness"
吉之, "good luck, of"
吉行, "good luck, to go"
善幸, "virtuous, happiness"
善之, "virtuous, of"
善行, "virtuous, to go"
芳幸, "virtuous/fragrant, happiness"
芳之, "virtuous/fragrant, of"
芳行, "virtuous/fragrant, to go"
嘉之, "excellent, of"
嘉行, "excellent, to go"
好之, "good/like something, of"
慶之, "congratulate, of"
良幸, "good, happiness"

The name can also be written in hiragana よしゆき or katakana ヨシユキ.

Notable people with the given name Yoshiyuki
, Japanese bobsledder
, Japanese sumo wrestler
Yoshiyuki Iwamoto (岩本 義行, 1912–2008), Japanese baseball player
Yoshiyuki Kamei (亀井 善之, 1936–2006), Japanese politician
, Japanese footballer and manager
Yoshiyuki Kawashima (川島 義之, 1878–1945), general in the Imperial Japanese Army
, Japanese footballer
, Japanese fashion designer
Yoshiyuki Kouno (河野 義行, born 1950), victim of the Matsumoto incident
Yoshiyuki Kubota (窪田 義行, born 1972), Japanese shogi player
Yoshiyuki Matsumoto (松本 佳介, born 1971), Japanese shogi player
Yoshiyuki Matsuoka (松岡 義之, born 1957), Japanese judoka
, Japanese swimmer
, Japanese curler and curling coach
Yoshiyuki Sadamoto (貞本 義行, born 1962), Japanese character designer and manga artist
Yoshiyuki Sakaki (榊 佳之, born 1942), Japanese molecular biologist
Yoshiyuki Sato (佐藤 佳幸, born 1975), Japanese ski mountaineer
, Japanese speed skater
Yoshiyuki Shimozuma (下妻 由幸, born 1977), Japanese voice actor
Yoshiyuki Tomino (富野 喜幸, born 1941), Japanese anime creator, director, screenwriter and novelist
Yoshiyuki Tsuruta (鶴田 義行, 1903–1986), Japanese swimmer
Yoshiyuki Yoshida (吉田 善行, born 1974), Japanese mixed martial artist

Notable people with the surname Yoshiyuki
Eisuke Yoshiyuki (吉行 栄助, 1906–1940), Japanese writer
Junnosuke Yoshiyuki (吉行 淳之介, 1923–1994), Japanese writer
Kazuko Yoshiyuki (吉行 和子, born 1935), Japanese actress
Kohei Yoshiyuki (吉行 耕平, born 1946), Japanese photographer
, Japanese poet and writer
Yumi Yoshiyuki (吉行 由実, born 1965), Japanese film director, actress, and screenwriter

See also 
5172 Yoshiyuki, a main-belt asteroid

Japanese-language surnames
Japanese masculine given names